Brotherman in the Fatherland is an album by multi-instrumentalist Rahsaan Roland Kirk. It was recorded in concert in Hamburg, Germany, in 1972, with Ron Burton, Henry Metathias Pearson, Richie Goldberg and Joe Habao Texidor. The album was first released on the Hyena label in 2006.

Reception

The AllMusic review by Thom Jurek states "This gig, recorded in 1972, is one of those seemingly out-of-nowhere moments when Kirk, struggling to make a living, took it to the audience full-force... Like his best live outings — this one doesn't have the same sound quality as Bright Moments — this one is simply astonishing in its intensity, soul, and acumen. One can only wonder when hearing the polite applause at the end of the gig (instead of the justifiable shouting and screaming that should've been there) if the German crowd were just blown away, or confused. Listeners, too, may wonder if they can believe what has just transpired in the space of an hour. They can". The Penguin Guide to Jazz described the material chosen by Hyena as "shoddy selections". The JazzTimes reviewer wrote that "Kirk's instrumental versatility – as well as his improvisational virtuosity – shines through".

Track listing 
All compositions by Rahsaan Roland Kirk except as indicated.
 "Intro/Like Sonny" (John Coltrane) - 8:32  
 "Make It with You" (David Gates) - 5:39  
 "Rahsaan's Spirit" - 7:04  
 "My Girl" (Smokey Robinson, Ronald White) - 5:15  
 "Seasons/Serenade to a Cuckoo" - 6:54  
 "Pedal Up" - 10:20  
 "Lush Life" (Billy Strayhorn) - 3:12  
 "Afro Blue" (Mongo Santamaría) - 4:04  
 "Blue Train" (Coltrane) - 17:31  
 Recorded at the Funkhaus in Hamburg, Germany on March 3, 1972

Personnel 
 Roland Kirk: tenor saxophone, manzello, stritch, clarinet, flute
 Ron Burton: piano
 Henry Metathias Pearson: bass
 Richie Goldberg: drums
 Joe Habad Texidor: percussion

References 

Hyena Records albums
Rahsaan Roland Kirk live albums
2006 live albums